The list of ship launches in 1724 includes a chronological list of some ships launched in 1724.


References

1724
Ship launches